Papillon, papillons, or le papillon may refer to:

Animals
Butterfly
 Papillon (dog), a dog breed
 Papillon (horse), a racehorse, winner of the 2000 Grand National

Arts, entertainment, and media
 Papillon, a fictional character in the anime series Busou Renkin

Film and television 
 Papillon (1973 film), an adaptation of Henri Charriere's book, starring Steve McQueen
 Papillon (2017 film), another adaptation of Henri Charriere's book, starring Charlie Hunnam
 Le Papillon (film) or The Butterfly, a 2002 French film starring Michel Serrault
 Papillon (TV series), a live action comedy series

Games 
 Papillon (card game), an historical French card game of the fishing family

Literature
 Papillon (book) (1969), a memoir by Henri Charrière about his imprisonment at the Devil's Island penal colony in French Guiana
 Papillon (manga), a manga series by Ueda Miwa

Music and dance
 Papillon (Hitomi Shimatani album), 2001, or the title song
Papillon (Lara Fabian album), 2019
 Papillon, a 2015 album by the French artist Sanseverino 
 Le papillon (ballet), an 1860 ballet
 Papillons, a series of piano dances by Robert Schumann

Songs
 "Papillon (Chaka Khan song)" aka (Hot Butterfly), a song by Gregg Diamond, covered by Chaka Khan
 "Papillon" (Editors song), a song by Editors 
 "Papillon", a song by The Airborne Toxic Event from The Airborne Toxic Event 
 "Papillon", a song by Rilo Kiley from The Initial Friend
 "Papillon", a song by Stratovarius from Elements Pt. 1
 "Papillon", a song by Celine Dion from S'il suffisait d'aimer 
 "Papillon (On the Wings of the Butterfly)", a song by David Arkenstone
 "Papillon", a song by The Twilight Singers from Blackberry Belle
 "Papillon", a song by Oasis & Yiruma from Yiruma
 "Papillon", a song by Patrick Norman (singer)
 "Papillon", a song by Rolf Harris	
 "Papillon", a song by Nicole
 "Papillon", a song by Jackson Wang
 "Papillon", a song by Secret Garden from Songs from a Secret Garden

Other uses
 Le Papillon (restaurant), a French restaurant in San Jose, California
 Papillon Hall, Lubenham, a historic house in Leicestershire, England, built in about 1620, remodelled by Edwin Lutyens in 1903, and demolished in 1950
 Papillon Records, a British record label
Papillon (name), including a list of people with the name
Papillon–Lefèvre syndrome, a human genetic disorder
The 'Papillon' technique, a radiotherapy treatment for rectal cancer

See also
Butterfly (disambiguation)
Papillion (disambiguation)